"The One After Joey and Rachel Kiss" is the first episode of Friends tenth season. It first aired on the NBC network in the United States on September 25, 2003.

Plot
In their hotel room at Barbados, Monica, Phoebe and Chandler overhear Ross kissing Charlie, while through the room's other wall they can eavesdrop on Joey and Rachel. Ross decides to stop anything else that could happen with Charlie, and decides to tell Joey about it. He goes to Rachel's room, at which point, she makes Joey hide and he is pulled into the other room by Chandler to eavesdrop while Ross tells Rachel about kissing Charlie. After Ross leaves, Joey and Rachel, at the others' urging and unable to stop picturing Ross while trying to kiss, agree to put their relationship on hold until they talk to Ross. On the plane home, Ross tells Joey about him and Charlie, but Joey does not tell Ross about him and Rachel in the effect that it might upset him. Back in New York, Rachel tries to tell Ross, but he becomes mad over shampoo-explosion-related emergencies. Rachel and Joey decide to tell him together the next morning. But when an attempt to kiss each other goodnight turns into a make-out session between them, Ross walks in on them.

Meanwhile, Mike tells Phoebe that he has in fact been seeing another woman, Precious, but he will break up with her at their date that evening. Due to a miscommunication however, Precious heads to Mike's apartment and encounters Phoebe. Precious demands an explanation and Phoebe breaks up with her on Mike's behalf. Precious starts to freak out, which Phoebe unsuccessfully tries to stop with some tough love. Phoebe tries a different tactic and convinces Precious that Mike is not worth it, pointing out that he was going to break up with her on her birthday, after not even telling her he was still in love with Phoebe and was flying to Barbados to propose. Precious takes the talk to heart, and, when Mike arrives, slaps him in the face before storming out.

After Chandler is annoyed by Monica's hair frizzing up in the humidity, Monica goes to the salon and returns with a braided hairstyle with cornrows. In spite of Chandler disliking the cornrows, she has fun with them until she gets tangled in the shower. At Chandler's urging, she agrees to get rid of the cornrows, but finds a Jamaican hat to wear with her hair.

Reception
In the original broadcast, the episode was viewed by 24.54 million viewers. Sam Ashurst from Digital Spy ranked it #197 on their ranking of the 236 Friends episodes. Telegraph & Argus also ranked it #197 on their ranking of all 236 Friends episodes.

References

2003 American television episodes
Friends (season 10) episodes